Herman John Wedemeyer (May 20, 1924 – January 25, 1999) was an American actor, football player, and politician. He is best known for portraying Sergeant/Detective "Duke" Lukela on the crime drama Hawaii Five-O (1972–1980). He also appeared on the first episode of Hawaii Five-O as Lt. Balta of Honolulu Police Department.

Sports career
Wedemeyer attended St. Louis School in Honolulu and was a standout in both football and baseball. Wedemeyer, a halfback, played college football for the St. Mary's College Galloping Gaels in Moraga, CA. In 1945, he finished fourth in the Heisman Trophy voting, and he was inducted into the College Football Hall of Fame in 1979. Wedemeyer was Hawai'i's first consensus All-American football player. He bore the colorful nicknames 'Squirmin' Herman,' 'The Flyin' Hawaiian,' 'The Hawaiian Centipede,' and 'The Hula-Hipped Hawaiian.'

Wedemeyer was a first-round draft choice of the Los Angeles Dons of the All-America Football Conference in 1948. Despite leading the AAFC in punt return yardage that year, he was waived by the Dons. He was then signed by the AAFC Baltimore Colts, with whom he played in 1949 before retiring from professional sports for good.

Government service
In 1968, Wedemeyer was elected to the Honolulu City Council as a Republican. In 1970, he was elected to the Hawaii House of Representatives as a Democrat, winning re-election in 1972. He served as the chairman of the Committee on Tourism.

Hawaii Five-O
Wedemeyer played Edward D. "Duke" Lukela on Hawaii Five-O from 1971 to 1980, appearing in 143 episodes. Lukela was originally a uniformed HPD sergeant, but he later joined the Five-O squad as a detective.

Personal life
Herman Wedermeyer was the most famous football player in all of Hawaii - in the 4th quarter of a game in the stadium in Honolulu. On the kickoff, he was in the end zone and caught the ball. He bent over and put the football on top of his shoe and the opposing team thought he had downed the ball, but the refree saw he didn't. Thus, Wedermeyer put the ball under his arm and jogged 100 yards into the opposing end zone without anyone touching him. The refree declared a touchdown which won the game. 
Wedermeyer's brother was Charlie Wedemeyer, a former Michigan State football player who, after being diagnosed with Lou Gehrig's disease, continued to teach and coach football at Los Gatos High School. Charlie was the subject of a television drama called Quiet Victory: The Charlie Wedemeyer Story and the PBS documentary "One More Season".

Filmography

Hawaii Five-O (1968–1980) - Det. Duke Lukela 
The Hawaiians (1970) - Fire Chief (uncredited)
Magnum, P.I. (1981) - Coroner
Hawaii Five-O (1998 TV pilot) (1998) - Duke (final film role)

References

External links
Hawaii Sports Hall of Fame Profile

Herman Wedemeyer Fan Home Page

1924 births
1999 deaths
All-American college football players
Male actors from Honolulu
American football running backs
Los Angeles Dons players
Baltimore Colts (1947–1950) players
College Football Hall of Fame inductees
Male actors from Hawaii
Members of the Hawaii House of Representatives
20th-century American male actors
20th-century American politicians
Players of American football from Honolulu
American athlete-politicians
Native Hawaiian male actors